This was the first edition of the event.

Donald Young won the title, defeating Matthew Ebden in the final, 4–6, 6–4, 6–2.

Seeds

Draw

Finals

Top half

Bottom half

References
 Main Draw
 Qualifying Draw

Napa Valley Challenger - Singles
2013 Singles